Joanna Drabik (born 28 October 1993) is a Polish handballer for MKS Zagłębie Lubin and the Polish national team.

She participated at the 2018 European Women's Handball Championship.

Achievements
Polish Championship:
Winner: 2014
Carpathian Trophy:
Winner: 2017

References

External links

1987 births
Living people
People from Włoszczowa County
Polish female handball players
Expatriate handball players
Polish expatriate sportspeople in Hungary
Siófok KC players
Hungarian female handball players